The men's 200 metres event at the 1985 Summer Universiade was held at the Kobe Universiade Memorial Stadium in Kobe on 31 August and 2 September 1985.

Medalists

Results

Heats
Wind:Heat 4: -2.9 m/s

Quarterfinals
Wind:Heat 2: +2.5 m/s, Heat 3: -2.5 m/s

Semifinals

Final

Wind: +0.1 m/s

References

Athletics at the 1985 Summer Universiade
1985